Batavia Township is in Kane County, Illinois. It is divided by the Fox River. As of the 2010 census, its population was 35,221 and it contained 12,892 housing units. The western part of the United States Department of Energy's Fermilab is at the township's eastern edge (formerly in the village of Weston), although most of the facility is in neighboring Winfield Township in DuPage County.

Geography
Unlike the prototypical Midwestern township, which is a six mile by six mile square, Batavia splits such a  square with Geneva Township.

Cities and towns
 Aurora (small part)
 Batavia (vast majority)
 North Aurora (northern half)

Unincorporated towns
 Mooseheart

Adjacent townships
 Geneva Township (north)
 Winfield Township (east)
 Blackberry Township (west)
 Aurora Township (south)
 Naperville Township (southeast)
 Sugar Grove Township (southwest)

School districts
 Batavia Public School District 101
 West Aurora Public School District 129

Cemeteries
The township contains Westside, Eastside, and River Hills cemeteries.

Major highways
 Illinois State Route 56
 Illinois State Route 31
 Illinois State Route 25

Demographics

Notes

References

External links
 

1849 establishments in Illinois
Townships in Kane County, Illinois
Townships in Illinois
Populated places established in 1849